The Matrimonial Bed is a 1930 American pre-Code comedy film produced and released by Warner Bros. It was based on the French play by André Mouëzy-Éon and Yves Mirande. The English version of the play, by Sir Seymour Hicks, opened in New York on October 12, 1927 and had 13 performances.

Plot
Leopold Trebel (Frank Fay) is a man who was in a train wreck five years earlier and was taken for dead by his wife, Juliet (Florence Eldridge). Leopold and Juliet have both remarried. Leopold, who remembers nothing that occurred before the train wreck, is the father of two sets of twins by his new wife, Sylvaine (Lilyan Tashman). Juliet has recently had a child with her new husband, Gustave Corton (James Gleason). Leopold is a very popular hairdresser and some of Juliet's friends urge her to try him out.

When Leopold shows up at her home, he shocks the servants and his ex-wife. A doctor manages to restore Leopold's memory through hypnosis but in the process makes him forget what has happened in the last five years. When Leopold awakes from hypnosis, he thinks he has only been unconscious for a short while. He assumes he is still Juliet's husband. The doctor warns everyone not to tell him the truth because the shock could kill him. Just at this crucial moment, Gustave Corton arrives home and is shocked to find Leopold in his bed. Later on, Sylvaine arrives only to find her husband in bed with Gustave Corton. Eventually, Leopold learns what has happened and asks the doctor to pretend to take back his memory so that Juliet, whom he deeply loves, can continue to live her new life.

Pre-Code Sequences
 Leopold is discovered in bed with Gustave, and Sylvaine assumes they are having an affair and, shocked, exclaims: "What kind of a house is this?"
 When the doctor attempts to examine Leopold, the other assumes the doctor is gay and refuses to take off his shirt. When the doctor turns off the light to hypnotize him, Leopold exclaims that he was right in his suspicions about him.
 The movie has numerous gay jokes as the hairdresser/husband played by Leopold. Actor Frank Fay camps up the hairdresser persona to differentiate himself from the personality of the husband. There are lines like "I may be a hairdresser but that doesn't mean I hold men's hands". When he asks what manner of person was he as the hairdresser, he is told, "You were gay, a bit dandified."

Cast

Frank Fay as Adolphe Noblet/Leopold
Lilyan Tashman as Sylvaine 
James Gleason as Gustave Corton
Beryl Mercer as Corinne
Marion Byron as Marianne
Vivian Oakland as Suzanne Trebel
Arthur Edmund Carew as Dr. Friedland
James Bradbury Sr. as Chabonnais
Florence Eldridge as Juliette

Preservation status
A print is held in the Library of Congress collection.

References

External links 
 
 

1930 films
Warner Bros. films
American films based on plays
1930s English-language films
Films about amnesia
Films directed by Michael Curtiz
American black-and-white films
Films scored by Louis Silvers
American comedy films
1930 comedy films
1930s American films